Pentacitrotus maculatus is a species of moth of the family Tortricidae. It is found in Nepal.

The wingspan is about 15 mm. The forewings are orange lilac, margined by a narrow black line and with black markings, bordered by narrow leaden-metallic lines. The hindwings are crimson orange or dark reddish orange with brownish-black markings.

References

Moths described in 1993
Ceracini